Anthony, Antony, or Tony Walker may refer to:

Sportspeople
Anthony Walker (rower) (born 1939), Australian Olympic rower
Anthony Walker (rugby league) (born 1991), rugby league player
Tony Walker (outfielder) (born 1959), American baseball player
Tony Walker (pitcher), American baseball player
Anthony Walker Jr. (born 1995), American football player

Others
Anthony Walker (artist) (1726–1765), English printmaker
Anthony Guy Walker (born 1957), American criminal and serial killer
Antony Walker (born 1934), British general
Murder of Anthony Walker, high-profile British murder in 2005
Antony Walker (conductor), Australian-born conductor of mostly opera
Tony Walker (born 1956), British participant in the Up (film series) documentaries

See also 
John Anthony Walker (1937–2014), US Navy officer convicted of spying for the Soviet Union